Calotis hispidula, the Bogan flea or bindi eye, is a hairy species of daisy found in many parts of mainland Australia. A small herbaceous plant to 10 centimetres tall. White flowers are often seen in the winter months. The specific epithet "hispidula" refers to the plant's covering of stiff hairs. Name; Gk, beautiful-ear, alluding to the ear shaped pappus scales as seen in C.cuneifolia. A genus of small herbs with 24 species in Australia and 2 in Asia. Calotis spp. are innocent looking Daisies until they fruit and he heads develop into fiendish masses of rigid needle-sharp barbs. Mainly opportunistic inhabitants of grasslands. The barbed burrs can be easily transported by livestock.

Description 

Annual prostrate or ascending herb to 10 cm high; hirsute.
Basal leaves absent; cauline leaves sessile, cuneate to oblanceolate, 0.5–2 cm long, 1–7 mm wide, margins entire or toothed at apex, lamina hispid to hirsute.
Heads 4–10 mm diam., in dense leafy cymes; involucral bracts, lanceolate to spathulate, acute, hispid; receptacle conical, with scales. Ray florets yellow; ligule c. 1 mm long.
Achenes 1–2.5 mm long, pubescent, with narrow marginal ridges; pappus of 5 or 6 awns, barbed towards apex, hairy at the base and with 5 or 6 hairy deeply divided finger-like scales.
Prostrate to ascending annual with stems to c. 12 cm long, variably pilose to strigose. Leaves cuneate, obovate, elliptic or oblong, 5–20 mm long, 2–8 mm wide, distally 3(–5)-toothed or entire, tapered evenly to base. Capitula commonly only c. 3 mm diam. in flower, enlarging rapidly to c. 1 cm in fruit; involucral bracts c. oblanceolate, 2.5–4 mm long; ray florets c. 10, yellow, c. 1 mm long; disc florets fertile. Cypsela body 2–2.5 mm long, pale to dark red-brown, pubescent on faces and at apex; major awns 4 or 5, 1–2.5 mm long, spreading c. horizontally, woolly near base, barbed near apex, alternating with shorter, finer awns or deeply dissected scales. Flowers mostly Aug.–Oct

Ecology 

The species grows in sandy soil on flats, low dunes and small hills and appears to be associated with Acacia woodlands and chenopod shrublands.
At Mt Mulyah, Calotis spp. grows in an area cleared of original acacia cambagei woodland and subsequently invaded by dodonaea viscosa subsp. angustissima which repressed the growth of herbaceous species.
Apparently a perennial that flowers in the first year of growth; no plants have been observed to survive for more than two years; flowering is recorded for September and fruit have been collected in October.
No regeneration of this species has been seen at Mt Mulyah since 1984.
Calotis can often be found growing in conjunction with other Calotis species such as C. cymbacantha and C. erinacea and are very similar morphologically. The main identifying feature is the number of awns on the fruit with C. moorei having greater than four.

Distribution 

Grows in heavy clays to shallow stony soils, in a wide variety of communities; widespread, especially in inland districts. Known and current population ranges from NSW, Qld, Vic, NT, SA and WA. Found abundantly in Central Australia. Recorded populations can be seen on the figure to the right (yellow dots on the map of Australia).

Threats 

There are no obvious threats to Bogan Flea and it may not be in decline; however, weed invasion, clearing, agricultural activity, and grazing may impact this species (NSW DEC 2005). A very small localised population is inherently at risk from chance events. Small populations are also more susceptible to adverse genetic influences, such as inbreeding depression. Experts doubt that plants survive more than two years. It is suggested that this may be because of the invasion of Narrow-leaf Hop Bush, which tends to suppress herb growth. 
Agricultural (ploughing and clearing) activity may threaten Bogans Flea. However, seeds are long lived in the soil and occasional substrate disturbance shouldn't suppress the long-term viability of this species. 
Grazing is a potential threat to the populations, though the extent of the threat is uncertain. When mature, the plant is unlikely to be palatable due to the sharp, woody awns on the seeds. In dry times, the plant persists as seed in the soil and so would be unaffected by even heavy grazing pressure. Impacts are most likely following emergence until maturity.

References 

Astereae
Plants described in 1853
Flora of New South Wales
Flora of Victoria (Australia)
Flora of Queensland
Flora of South Australia
Flora of the Northern Territory
Flora of Western Australia